Potassium octacyanomolybdate(IV) is the inorganic salt with the formula K4[Mo(CN)8]. A yellow light-sensitive solid, it is the potassium salt of the cyanometalate with the coordination number eight. The complex anion consists of a Mo(IV) center bound to eight cyanide ligands resulting in an overall charge of −4, which is balanced with four potassium cations. The salt is often prepared as its dihydrate K4[Mo(CN)8].(H2O)2.

Preparation 
The dihydrate K4[Mo(CN)8] · 2 H2O can be prepared by the reduction of molybdate (MoO42-) with potassium borohydride (KBH4) in a solution with potassium cyanide and acetic acid. Yields of 70% are typical and the method is suited for scale-up.

4MoO42- + 32CN− + BH4− + 25H+ → 4 [Mo(CN)8]4- + 13H2O + H3BO3

An alternative route starts from MoCl4(Et2O)2 avoiding the need for reductants. The yield of this route is typically around 70%. This synthesis is convenient for lower batch sizes than the earlier method but the MoCl4(Et2O)2 is typically less available than the molybdate.
MoCl4(Et2O)2 + 8KCN → K4[Mo(CN)8] + 4KCl + 2Et2O

Reactions 
Octacyanomolybdate(IV) can be oxidized to the paramagnetic octacyanomolybdate(V).

The cyanide ligands in [Mo(CN)8]4- remain basic. Strong acids lead to the hydrogen isocyanide complex [Mo(CNH)8]4+, in common with many cyanometalate complexes. These ligands can be substituted by others, for example H2O. The cyanide ligands also bind to other metals, leading to cages.

References 

Cyano complexes
Coordination complexes
Molybdenum(IV) compounds
Potassium compounds
Cyanometallates